Youssef Dey Mosque, also known as Al B'chamqiya, is a 17th-century mosque in Tunis, Tunisia, located in Medina area of the city. The mosque is considered significant as it was the first Ottoman-Turkish mosque to be built in Tunis.

An official Historical Monument, it operated primarily as public speaking venue before becoming a real mosque by Youssef Dey in 1631. At the time it was the 11th mosque to be built in the capital. In the late nineteenth century it underwent extensive restoration, ordered by Ali Bey. A decree in 1926 saw the mosque become an annex of the University of Ez-Zitouna.

Hall of prayer 
The prayer room is framed by courtyards on three sides to the east, north and west. Along the northern facade, a portico plays the role of gallery-narthex. Rectangular in plan, the room perpetuates the classical plan of the hypostyle hall; it consists of nine naves and seven bays. The arches rest on columns, of various origins, which carry capitals of Hafsid type, except some ancient examples. The covering of the prayer hall is in groin vault; a cupola on an octagonal base and horns in front of the mihrab. Near the latter is the masonry minbar covered with panels of  polychrome marble; this is a novelty by contribution to mosques of Malikis whose minbar is executed in wood.

Minaret 
Its minaret is the first octagonal minaret to be built in Tunis and was made by the Hafsids. The octagonal tower rises above a square base. It ends with a balcony protected by a wooden awning, the whole is crowned by a lantern with pyramidal roof covered with green tiles.

Mausoleum 
The mosque also includes the mausoleum of Youssef Dey, inaugurating in Tunis the funeral mosque in which the tomb of the founder associates with the place of worship. Square plan, the mausoleum is covered with a pyramidal roof covered with green tiles. It has on each face a large central blind arcade, flanked by two levels of recesses in flat bottom. The facings of the white marble facades are accented with clavellus alternating black and white. A commemorative inscription on the central arch provides the date of construction of the mausoleum.

References

Mosques in the medina of Tunis
Religious buildings and structures completed in 1631
17th-century mosques
1631 establishments in the Ottoman Empire
1631 establishments in Africa
Ottoman architecture in Tunisia